Rampurhat Assembly constituency is an assembly constituency in Birbhum district in the Indian state of West Bengal.

Overview
As per orders of the Delimitation Commission, No. 291, Rampurhat Assembly constituency is composed of the following: Rampurhat municipality, Rampurhat I CD Block and Bharkata, Gonpur, Hinglow, Kapista, Rampur and Sekedda gram panchayats of Mohammad Bazar CD Block.

Rampurhat Assembly constituency is part of No. 42 Birbhum (Lok Sabha constituency).

Election results

2021

2016

2011
In the 2011 elections, Asish Banerjee of Trinamool Congress defeated his nearest rival Rebati Bhattacharya of AIFB.

 

.# Swing calculated on Congress+Trinamool Congress vote percentages taken together in 2006. For Trinamool Congress alone the swing was -0.02%.

1977–2006
In 2006 and 2001 state assembly elections, Asish Banerjee of Trinamool Congress won the Rampurhat assembly constituency defeating Nirad Baran Mandal of Forward Bloc in 2006, and Md. Hannan of Forward Bloc in 2001. Contests in most years were multi cornered but only winners and runners are being mentioned. Md. Hannan of Forward Block defeated Satyendra Nath Das of BJP in 1996. Sashanka Mondal of Forward Bloc defeated Satyendra Nath Das of BJP in 1991, Asish Banerjee of Congress in 1987,  Ananda Gopal Roy of Congress in 1982 and Tapas Kumar Mukhopadhyay of Janata Party in 1977.

1951–1972
Ananda Gopal Roy of Congress won in 1972. Braja Mohan Mukherjee of CPI(M) won in 1971. Sasanka Sekhar Mongal of Forward Bloc won in 1969 and 1967. Niharika Majumdar of Congress won in 1962. In 1957 and 1951 Rampurhat was a joint seat. Gobardhan Das of CPI and Durgapada Das, Independent, won in 1957. In independent India's first election in 1951 Panchanan Let and Srikumar Bandopadhyay, both of Forward Block, won.

References

Assembly constituencies of West Bengal
Politics of Birbhum district